Morning Glory is an American punk rock band from New York. It was formed originally as a solo project by Ezra Kire, after the band Choking Victim disbanded in 1999. This is the second band to use this name.  The first one was a San Francisco rock band in the late 1960s who had one album, "Two Suns Worth" (1968) on Fontana Records (cat #SRF 67573).  They played many concerts around the San Francisco bay area 1967-1970).

Discography 
This Is No Time ta Sleep (2001) – Revolution Rock Records
The Suicide Singles (2001) – Revolution Rock Records
The Whole World Is Watching (2003) – Blacknoise Records
The Kids Are Gonna Pay... (2006) Split with Leftöver Crack, F-Minus and Bent Outta Shape – Blacknoise Records
The Whole World Is Watching (Re-Issue with 3 new songs) (2007) – Blacknoise Records
Poets Were My Heroes (2012) – Fat Wreck Chords
Born To December 7" (2013) – Fat Wreck Chords
Always Alone (2013) Split EP with Off With Their Heads – Fat Wreck Chords
War Psalms (2014) – Fat Wreck Chords
Post War Psalms (2016)  EP – Buyback Records

Music videos
 "Born to December" (2013)
 "Punx Not Dead, I Am" (2014)
 "I Am Machine Gun" (2014)

References 

Fat Wreck Chords artists
Punk rock groups from New York (state)
American ska punk musical groups
Hardcore punk groups from New York (state)
A-F Records artists
American crust and d-beat groups